is a Japanese wrestler. She won a gold medal at the 2014 Asian Games in the 63 kg category.

References

External links
 

Japanese female sport wrestlers
1991 births
Living people
Asian Games medalists in wrestling
Wrestlers at the 2014 Asian Games
Asian Games gold medalists for Japan
Wrestlers at the 2016 Summer Olympics
Olympic wrestlers of Japan
Medalists at the 2014 Asian Games
21st-century Japanese women
Asian Wrestling Championships medalists